Stanley House may refer to:

Canada
 Camp Ekon, formerly known as Stanley House, in Ontario, Canada.

Denmark
 Stanley House, Copenhagen

Hong Kong
 Stanley House aka. Maryknoll House (Stanley)

United Kingdom
Stanley House, Castletown, Isle of Man, one of Isle of Man's Registered Buildings

United States
 Stanley-Whitman House, Farmington, Connecticut, listed on the National Register of Historic Places (NRHP)
 Stanley-Woodruff-Allen House, West Hartford, Connecticut, NRHP-listed
 Leonard W. Stanley House, Waltham, Massachusetts, NRHP-listed
 Stanley House (Lima, New York), NRHP-listed in Livingston County, New York